Ogbomosho North is a Local Government Area in Oyo State, Nigeria. Its headquarters are on Ilorin Road and currently headed by the chairman, Kabir Akanji.
The local government serves as a home to one of Nigeria's best institution of learning, Ladoke Akintola University of Technology (LAUTECH) and it teaching hospital(still under construction). Also, the Nigerian Baptist Medical Center and Bowen University Teaching hospital are situated there. The SOUN Palace is the major traditional home of the city. Ogbomoso North is the most populated local government in the city, being the city's major economic nerve and has a land mass of 235 km.
It is the most populous local government in the city as at the 2006 census.

The postal code of the area is 210.

References

Local Government Areas in Oyo State
Ogbomosho